Cycas petraea is a species of cycad endemic to Thailand.

It is known only from a single line of limestone mountains flanking the Phu Kra Dueng massif to the east, in Phu Kradueng National Park, Loei Province, Thailand.

References

petraea